Micrulia is a genus of moths in the family Geometridae.

Species
Micrulia catocalaria (Snellen, 1881)
Micrulia cinerea (Warren, 1896)
Micrulia gyroducta (D. S. Fletcher, 1957)
Micrulia medioplaga (Swinhoe, 1902)
Micrulia rufula (Warren, 1899)
Micrulia subzebrina Holloway, 1997
Micrulia tenuilinea Warren, 1896

References

External links

Eupitheciini